Muse is a 2019 British psychological horror film written, directed and produced by Candida Brady and starring Rupert Everett, Alison Doody, Derek Jacobi and Géza Röhrig. It had its worldwide premiere on 18 October 2019.

Premise
A hugely successful artist spirals into a depression following his new-found fortune and is tormented by his inner demons.

Cast
 Géza Röhrig as Luca
 Rupert Everett as The Demon
 Alison Doody as Grace
 Derek Jacobi as The Lawyer
 Simon Godley as George
 Caroline Goodall as The Nurse
 Rupert Holliday-Evans as The Bailiff
 Jenni Murray as Herself

References

External links

2019 films
2019 drama films
2019 horror films
2010s English-language films